Men's Olympic / East Summit is a World Cup downhill ski course in Canada on the Mount Whitehorn in Lake Louise, Alberta. The race course debuted in 1980.

Part of Lake Louise Ski Resort, the course has hosted 82 women's World Cup events (third all-time) and 45 events for men (13th all-time).

World Cup

It made its World Cup debut in 1980 and hosted men's speed events irregularly; since 1999, it has been part of annual World Cup calendar. Women's events have been regularly held on the course since 1989.

Course sections
Lone Pine, Tickety Chutes, Upper Wiwaxy, Coaches Corner, Fall Away, Fish Net, Waterfall, Gun Barrel, Timing Flat, Juniper Crossing, Claire's Corner

Men

Women

Club5+ 
In 1986, elite Club5 was originally founded by prestigious classic downhill organizers: Kitzbühel, Wengen, Garmisch, Val d’Isère and Val Gardena/Gröden, with goal to bring alpine ski sport on the highest levels possible.

Later over the years other classic longterm organizers joined the now named Club5+: Alta Badia, Cortina, Kranjska Gora, Maribor, Lake Louise, Schladming, Adelboden, Kvitfjell, St.Moritz and Åre.

References

External links
Lake Louise Ski Resort official skilouise.com

Skiing in Canada